Villafranca (Basque: Alesbes) is a town and municipality located in the province and  the autonomous community (Comunidad Foral) of Navarre, northern Spain.

References

External links
 Villafranca in the Bernardo Estornés Lasa - Auñamendi Encyclopedia (Euskomedia Fundazioa) 

Municipalities in Navarre